Intestinibacter  bartlettii is a species of bacteria belonging to the family Clostridiaceae and the only described species in the genus Intestinibacter.

Bibliography 

Clostridiaceae

Taxa described in 2014

Bacteria described in 2004